Syllepte vagalis is a moth species in the family Crambidae. It was described by Snellen in 1901. It is found in Indonesia (Java).

References

Moths described in 1901
vagalis
Moths of Indonesia